The 1967–68 FAW Welsh Cup is the 81st season of the annual knockout tournament for competitive football teams in Wales.

Key
League name pointed after clubs name.
CCL - Cheshire County League
FL D2 - Football League Second Division
FL D3 - Football League Third Division
FL D4 - Football League Fourth Division
SFL - Southern Football League
WLN - Welsh League North
W&DL - Wrexham & District Amateur League

Fifth round
Ten winners from the Fourth round and six new clubs.

Sixth round

Semifinal

Final

External links
The FAW Welsh Cup

1967-68
Wales
Cup